Simon Wheeler is a British screenwriter and television producer. He is best known for creating the ITV1 drama Kingdom, which starred Stephen Fry and Wheeler's wife, Hermione Norris.

He has also written for the crime series Wire in the Blood, which formerly starred Norris. In 2013, he produced the BBC miniseries Castles in the Sky with Eddie Izzard. He has since moved into teaching, heading the film department at the independent private school Bryanston near the couple's home in Blandford Forum, Dorset.

Family
Wheeler is one of the three sons of General Sir Roger Wheeler. He and Norris have two children together: Wilf, born June 2004, and Hero, born August 2007.

References

External links
 

Living people
British male screenwriters
British television producers
Year of birth missing (living people)